Maksim Alekseyevich Rudakov (born 22 January 1996) is a Russian football goalkeeper. He plays for Finnish club Honka on loan from Rostov.

Career

Club
Rudakov made his debut in the Russian Professional Football League for FC Zenit Penza on 3 September 2016 in a game against FC Kaluga.

On 21 December 2017 Rudakov joined the Finnish club HJK on loan for one year with an extension option. On 9 November 2018, HJK confirmed that Rudakov's loan deal had been extended for an additional season.

On 12 February 2020, he signed a 4.5-year contract with Russian Premier League club FC Rostov. He made his Russian Premier League debut for Rostov on 16 May 2021 in a game against FC Krasnodar.

On 16 June 2021, he joined Rotor Volgograd on loan for the 2021–22 season. On 10 August 2021, the loan was terminated early. On 25 December 2021, Rostov announced that he will return to Finland and join Honka on loan for the 2022 season.

International
Rudakov was included in the Russia national under-19 football team for the 2015 UEFA European Under-19 Championship, in which Russia was the runner-up, but did not play in any games behind the first-choice goalkeeper Anton Mitryushkin.

Career statistics

Club

References

External links
 
 

1996 births
Footballers from Saint Petersburg
Living people
Russian footballers
Association football goalkeepers
Russia youth international footballers
Russia under-21 international footballers
FC Zenit Saint Petersburg players
FC Zenit-2 Saint Petersburg players
Helsingin Jalkapalloklubi players
FC Rostov players
FC Rotor Volgograd players
FC Honka players
Russian Premier League players
Russian First League players
Russian Second League players
Veikkausliiga players
Russian expatriate footballers
Expatriate footballers in Finland
Russian expatriate sportspeople in Finland